Super Sireyna Worldwide 2014 was the first Super Sireyna Worldwide pageant, held on 19 July 2014. The event was held at Broadway Centrum, Manila, Philippines. Miss Sahhara of Nigeria crowned as the pageant's first winner at the end of the event

Results
🌐

Placements

Special awards

Contestants
8 Contestants competed for the title:

References

Beauty pageants in the Philippines
2014 beauty pageants